Dr. Shan Jixiang (born July 1954) is a Chinese politician, scholar, architect, serves as Dean of Gugong Academy of the Palace Museum. He served as curator of the Palace Museum between 2012 and 2019 and formerly as Director of the National Cultural Heritage Administration.

Shan was a member of the 10th, 11th and 12th National Committees of the Chinese People's Political Consultative Conference (CPPCC), president of Cultural Relics Society of China, and vice chairman of the Architectural Society of China.

Biography
Shan was born in Jiangning County, Jiangsu in July 1954. He graduated from Tsinghua University, where he studied urban planning and design under Wu Liangyong. Shan started his research on the conservation and planning of historical cities and cultural heritage areas while studying in Japan from 1980 to 1984. 

Shan Jixiang entered the workforce in January 1971 and joined the Communist Party of China in June 1985.

Shan was deputy director of the Beijing Municipal Urban Planning Administration from January 1992 to May 1994, and director and Party Branch Secretary of the Beijing Municipal Administration of Cultural Heritage from May 1994 to August 1997. He was Party chief of Fangshan District in August 1997, and held that office until January 2000. He became the Party Branch Secretary and director of Beijing Municipal Planning Commission in January 2001, and served until August 2002. In August 2002 he was promoted to become director of the National Cultural Heritage Administration and a member of the Party Group of the Ministry of Culture. In January 2012 he was appointed curator of the Palace Museum, replacing Zheng Xinmiao.

In December 2018 he was hired as senior professor of Southeast University.

According to a public announcement from the Palace Museum, Shan Jixiang retired on April 8, 2019, succeeded by the director of Dunhuang Research Academy, Wang Xudong.

Works

References

1954 births
Living people
Tsinghua University alumni
Chinese curators
People's Republic of China politicians from Jiangsu
Chinese Communist Party politicians from Jiangsu
Chinese architects